is a Japanese footballer who plays for ReinMeer Aomori.

Career
After attending the Niigata University of Health and Welfare, Yokoyama signed for Grulla Morioka, where he spent four seasons. In 2017, he joined JFL team ReinMeer Aomori.

Club statistics
Updated to 23 February 2020.

References

External links

Profile at ReinMeer Aomori

1990 births
Living people
Niigata University of Health and Welfare alumni
Association football people from Fukushima Prefecture
Japanese footballers
J3 League players
Japan Football League players
Iwate Grulla Morioka players
ReinMeer Aomori players
Association football goalkeepers